United Airlines Flight 93 was a domestic scheduled passenger flight that was hijacked by four al-Qaeda terrorists on the morning of September 11, 2001, as part of the September 11 attacks. The hijackers planned to crash the plane into a federal government building in Washington, D.C., the U.S. capital. They failed in their primary mission when the passengers fought back, forcing the terrorists to crash the plane in Somerset County, Pennsylvania, preventing them from reaching al-Qaeda's intended target but killing everyone aboard the flight. The Boeing 757-222 aircraft, carrying 44 passengers and crew, was flying United Airlines' daily scheduled morning flight from Newark International Airport in New Jersey to San Francisco International Airport in California, making it the only plane hijacked that day to not be a Los Angeles-bound flight.

Forty-six minutes into the flight, the hijackers murdered one passenger, stormed the cockpit, and struggled with the pilots as controllers on the ground listened in. Ziad Jarrah, who had trained as a pilot, took control of the aircraft and diverted it back toward the east coast, in the direction of D.C. Khalid Sheikh Mohammed and Ramzi bin al-Shibh, considered principal instigators of the attacks, have claimed that the intended target was the U.S. Capitol Building.

Several passengers and flight attendants learned from phone calls that suicide attacks had already been made by hijacked airliners on the World Trade Center in New York City and the Pentagon in Arlington County, Virginia. Less than half an hour following the hijacking, the passengers voted to take the plane from the hijackers, leading to the revolt. One person witnessed the impact from the ground, and news agencies began reporting the event within an hour.

Of the four aircraft hijacked on September 11the others were American Airlines Flight 11, United Airlines Flight 175, and American Airlines Flight 77United Airlines Flight93 was the only aircraft that did not reach its hijackers' intended target. A temporary memorial was built near the crash site soon after the attacks. Construction of a permanent Flight 93 National Memorial was dedicated on September 10, 2011, and a concrete and glass visitor center (situated on a hill overlooking the site) was opened exactly four years later.

Hijackers

The hijacking of Flight93 was led by Ziad Jarrah, a member of al-Qaeda. Jarrah was born in Lebanon to a wealthy family and had a secular upbringing. He intended to become a pilot and moved to Germany in 1996, enrolling at the University of Greifswald to study German. A year later, he moved to Hamburg and began studying aeronautical engineering at the Hamburg University of Applied Sciences. In Hamburg, Jarrah became a devout Muslim and associated with the radical Hamburg cell.

In November 1999, Jarrah left Hamburg for Afghanistan, where he spent three months. While there, he met with al-Qaeda leader Osama bin Laden in January 2000. Jarrah returned to Hamburg at the end of January and in February obtained a new passport containing no stamped records of his travels by reporting his passport as stolen.

In May, Jarrah received a visa from the U.S. Embassy in Berlin, arriving in Florida in June 2000. There, he began taking flying lessons and training in hand-to-hand combat. Jarrah maintained contact with his girlfriend in Germany and with his family in Lebanon in the months preceding the attacks. This close contact upset Mohamed Atta, the tactical leader of the plot, and al-Qaeda planners may have considered another operative, Zacarias Moussaoui, to replace him if he had backed out.

Four "muscle" hijackers were trained to storm the cockpit and overpower the crew, and three accompanied Jarrah on Flight93. The first, Ahmed al-Nami, arrived in Miami, Florida, on May 28, 2001, on a six-month tourist visa with United Airlines Flight 175 hijackers Hamza al-Ghamdi and Mohand al-Shehri. The second, Ahmed al-Haznawi, arrived in Miami on June8 with Flight11 hijacker Wail al-Shehri. The third, Saeed al-Ghamdi, arrived in Orlando, Florida, on June 27 with Flight175 hijacker Fayez Banihammad. Ziad Jarrah's and Saeed al-Ghamdi's passports were recovered from the Flight 93 crash site. Jarrah's family said he had been an "innocent passenger" on board the flight.

On August 3, 2001, an intended fifth hijacker, Mohammed al-Qahtani, flew into Orlando from Dubai. He was questioned by officials, who were dubious that he could support himself with only $2,800 cash to his name, and suspicious that he intended to become an illegal immigrant as he was using a one-way ticket. He was sent back to Dubai, and subsequently returned to Saudi Arabia.

Flight

The aircraft involved in the hijacking was a Boeing 757-222, registration  delivered to United Airlines in June 1996. The airplane had a capacity of 182 passengers; the September 11 flight carried 37 passengers, including the four terrorists, and seven crew members, a load factor of 20 percent, considerably below the 52 percent average Tuesday load factor for Flight93. The seven crew members were Captain Jason Dahl (43), First Officer LeRoy Homer Jr. (36), flight attendants Lorraine Bay, Sandra Bradshaw, Wanda Green, CeeCee Lyles, and purser Deborah Welsh.

Boarding

At 5:01 a.m. on the morning of September 11, Jarrah placed a cell phone call from Newark to Marwan al-Shehhi, the hijacker pilot of United Airlines Flight 175, in Boston, which authorities believe was to confirm that the plan for the attacks was proceeding. The four hijackers checked in for the flight between 07:03 and 07:39 Eastern Time. At 07:03, Ghamdi checked in without any luggage while Nami checked in two bags. At 07:24, Haznawi checked in one bag and at 07:39, Jarrah checked in without any luggage. Haznawi was the only hijacker selected for extra scrutiny by the Computer Assisted Passenger Prescreening System (CAPPS). His checked bag underwent extra screening for explosives, with no extra scrutiny required by CAPPS at the passenger-security checkpoint. None of the security checkpoint personnel reported anything unusual about the hijackers.

Haznawi and Ghamdi boarded the aircraft at 07:39 and sat in first class seats 6B and 3D respectively. Nami boarded one minute later and sat in first class seat 3C. Before boarding the plane, Jarrah made five telephone calls to Lebanon, one to France, and one to his girlfriend in Germany; he had sent a farewell letter the day before to say he loved her. He boarded at 07:48 and sat in seat 1B. The aircraft was scheduled to depart at 08:00 and pushed back from gate A17 at 08:01. It remained delayed on the ground until 08:42 because of heavy airport congestion.

Hijack warnings issued
The three other hijacked flights all departed within fifteen minutes of their scheduled times. By the time Flight93 became airborne, Flight 11 was four minutes away from hitting the North Tower and Flight 175 was being hijacked; Flight 77 was climbing normally and was nine minutes away from being hijacked.

With the attacks unfolding, air traffic officials began issuing warnings through the Aircraft Communication Addressing and Reporting System (ACARS). Ed Ballinger, the United flight dispatcher, began sending text cockpit warnings to United Airlines flights at 09:19, 17 minutes after he became aware of Flight 175's impact. Ballinger was responsible for multiple flights, and he sent the message to Flight93 at 09:23. Ballinger received a routine ACARS message from Flight93 at 09:21. At 9:22, after learning of the events at the World Trade Center, LeRoy Homer's wife, Melody Homer, had an ACARS message sent to her husband in the cockpit asking if he was all right. At 09:24, Flight93 received Ballinger's ACARS warning, "Beware any cockpit intrusiontwo a/c [aircraft] hit World Trade Center". At 9:26, pilot Jason Dahl, apparently puzzled by the message, responded, "Ed, confirm latest mssg plz -- Jason". At 09:27:25, the flight crew responded to routine radio traffic from air traffic control. This was the last communication made by the flight crew before the plane was hijacked.

Hijacking

The hijacking began at 09:28, by which point Flights 11 and 175 had long since crashed into the World Trade Center; the North Tower had been burning for as long as 42 minutes and the South Tower for the past 25. The only other plane still in the air, Flight 77, was within nine minutes of striking the Pentagon. The hijackers on those flights had waited no more than half an hour to commandeer the aircraft, most likely striking after the seat belt sign had been turned off and cabin service had begun. It is unknown why the hijackers on Flight93 waited 46 minutes to begin their assault. The evidence is that they attacked the pilots by at least 09:28:05, because the flight dived dramatically at that point680 feet in thirty seconds.

Cockpit transmissions and recordings
At 09:28:17, the aircraft made a communication to the Cleveland controller and the pilots of aircraft in the vicinity, "of unintelligible sounds of possible screaming or a struggle". A Cleveland Air Traffic Controller replied, "Somebody call Cleveland?" but received no reply. Thirty-five seconds later, the aircraft made another transmission. In both calls, a man was shouting, "Mayday! Mayday! Get out of here! Get out of here! Get out of here!" When Melody Homer and Sandy Dahl, Jason Dahl's wife, listened to the tape, Melody identified First Officer LeRoy Homer as the man who was shouting.

The aircraft dropped  in half a minute before the hijackers stabilized it. Of the four aircraft hijacked, Flight93 was the only aircraft that broadcast a distress call. It is likely that because the pilots had been warned of the World Trade Center hijackings and to beware of a cockpit intrusion, when they came under attack, they keyed the microphone so the struggle might be overheard by air traffic control. Cleveland Center air traffic controller John Werth believed it was not just a call for help but a warning.

The exact time at which Flight93 came under the hijackers' control cannot be determined. Officials believe that at 09:28, the hijackers killed Mark Rothenberg, assaulted the cockpit, and moved the passengers to the rear of the plane at the same time to minimize any chance that either the crew or the passengers would interfere with the attack. The other hijacked flights were taken by five-man teams, but Flight93 had only four hijackers, leading to speculation of a possible 20th hijacker. The 9/11 Commission believed that Mohammed al-Qahtani was the likely candidate for this role, but was unable to participate as he had been denied entry into the United States one month earlier. With many passengers saying in phone calls that they saw only three hijackers, the 9/11 Commission believed Jarrah remained seated until after the cockpit was seized and passengers were moved to the back of the aircraft and then took over the flight controls out of sight of the passengers.

The cockpit voice recorder began recording the final thirty minutes of Flight93 at 09:31:57. At this moment, it recorded Jarrah announcing, "Ladies and gentlemen: here the captain. Please sit down, keep remaining seating. We have a bomb on board. So sit." The commission believed Jarrah tried to make an announcement to the passengers, but pressed the wrong button, sending the message to Cleveland controllers; Mohamed Atta had made the same error on Flight 11. The controller understood the transmission, but responded, "Calling Cleveland center, you're unreadable. Say again, slowly."

The flight recordings indicate that a wounded man, believed to be Dahl, was moaning in the cockpit. The man pleaded, "No more," or "No," repeatedly, as the hijackers shouted for him to sit down and to stop touching something. Sandy believes that Dahl took actions to interfere with the hijackers, including possibly disengaging the autopilot, and rerouting the plane's radio frequency so that Jarrah's attempts to communicate with the passengers were instead transmitted to air traffic controllers. A woman, thought to be first-class flight attendant Debbie Welsh, is heard being held captive in the background and is heard struggling with the hijackers and pleading, "Please, please, don't hurt me." Jarrah instructed the autopilot to turn the plane and head east at 09:35:09. The woman in the cockpit is heard to say, "I don't want to die, I don't want to die" before being killed or otherwise silenced, followed by one of the hijackers saying in Arabic, "Everything is fine. I finished."

At 09:39, two minutes after Flight 77 impacted the Pentagon, air traffic controllers overheard Jarrah say, "Ah, here's the captain: I would like you all to remain seated. We have a bomb aboard, and we are going back to the airport, and we have our demands. So please remain quiet." Air traffic controllers did not hear from the flight again. According to the commission, the hijackers could have learned of the successful attacks on the World Trade Center from messages being sent by United Airlines to the cockpits of its transcontinental flights, including Flight 93, warning of cockpit intrusion and telling of the New York attacks.

In the cockpit, the wounded man continued to moan and seemingly repeatedly disengaged the autopilot, as at 09:40, there were horn sounds that indicated the hijackers were having trouble with the autopilot and were fiddling with a green knob. "This green knob?" one of the hijackers asks the other in Arabic. Another hijacker responded, "Yes, that's the one." At 09:41:56, the wounded man, in a moaning tone, said, "Oh, man!". As the man continued moaning, the hijackers were heard to say "Inform them, and tell him to talk to the pilot; bring the pilot back". As the moaning man was thought to be Dahl, the hijackers might have possibly been referring to Homer, suggesting he was also still alive. A United employee in San Francisco sent an ACARS message to the flight at 09:46, "Heard report of incident. Plz confirm all is normal."

Passenger and crew phone calls
Passengers and crew began making phone calls to officials and family members starting at 09:30 using GTE airphones and mobile phones. Altogether, the passengers and crew made 35 airphone calls and two cell phone calls from the flight. Ten passengers and two crew members were able to connect, providing information to family, friends, and others on the ground.

Tom Burnett made several phone calls to his wife, Deena, beginning at 09:30:32 from rows 24 and 25, though he was assigned a seat in row 4. Burnett explained that the plane had been hijacked by men claiming to have a bomb. He also said a passenger had been stabbed with a knife and that he believed the bomb threat was a ruse to control the passengers. Burnett said the stabbed passenger was dead, having failed to exhibit signs of a pulse.

It is believed that passenger Mark Rothenberg was the victim. Rothenberg was the only first class passenger who did not make a phone call after the hijacking. Rothenberg was seated in 5B, and Haznawi sat directly behind him in 6B. On Flight 11, Satam al-Suqami, in seat 10B, attacked passenger Daniel Lewin, who was seated directly in front of him in 9B. One assumption is that Haznawi attacked Rothenberg, unprovoked, to frighten other passengers and crew into compliance. Alternatively, Rothenberg may have attempted to stop the hijacking and confront the hijackers.

Burnett's wife informed him of the attacks on the World Trade Center and he replied that the hijackers were "talking about crashing this plane.... Oh my God. It's a suicide mission." He began asking her for information about the attacks, interrupting her from time to time to tell other passengers nearby what she was saying. Then he hung up. In his next call, Deena informed Burnett of the attack on the Pentagon. Burnett relayed this to the other passengers, and told Deena he and a group of other passengers were putting together a plan to retake the plane. He ended his last call by saying, "Don't worry, we're going to do something." An unknown flight attendant attempted to contact the United Airlines maintenance facility at 09:32:29. The call lasted 95 seconds, but was not received as it may have been in queue. Flight attendant Sandra Bradshaw called the maintenance facility at 09:35:40 from row 33. She reported the flight had been hijacked by men with knives who were in the cabin and flight deck and had stabbed another flight attendant, possibly Debbie Welsh.

Mark Bingham called his mother at 09:37:03 from row 25. He reported that the plane had been hijacked by three men who claimed to have a bomb. Jeremy Glick called his wife at 09:37:41 from row 27 and told her the flight was hijacked by three dark-skinned men who looked "Iranian", wearing red bandanas and wielding knives. Glick remained connected until the end of the flight. He reported that the passengers voted whether to "rush" the hijackers. The United air traffic control coordinator for West Coast flights, Alessandro "Sandy" Rogers, alerted the Federal Aviation Administration (FAA) Herndon Command Center in Herndon, Virginia, that Flight93 was not responding and was off course. A minute later, the transponder was turned off, but the Cleveland controller continued to monitor the flight on primary radar. The Herndon Center relayed information on Flight93 to FAA headquarters. Joseph DeLuca called his father at 09:43:03 from row 26 to inform him the flight had been hijacked.

Todd Beamer attempted to call his wife from row 32 at 09:43:48, but was routed to GTE phone operator Lisa D. Jefferson. Beamer told the operator the flight had been hijacked and that two people who he thought were the pilots were on the floor, dead or injured. He said one of the hijackers had a red belt with what looked to be a bomb strapped to his waist. When the hijackers veered the plane sharply south, Beamer briefly panicked, exclaiming, "We're going down! We're going down!" Linda Gronlund called her sister, Elsa Strong, at 09:46:05 and left her a message saying there were "men with a bomb".

Flight attendant CeeCee Lyles called her husband at 09:47:57 and left him a message saying the plane had been hijacked. Marion Britton called her friend, Fred Fiumano, at 09:49:12. Fiumano recalled, "she said, 'We're gonna. They're gonna kill us, you know, We're gonna die.' And I told her, 'Don't worry, they hijacked the plane, they're gonna take you for a ride, you go to their country, and you come back. You stay there for vacation.' You don't know what to saywhat are you gonna say? I kept on saying the same things, 'Be calm.' And she was crying and... screaming and yelling."

Flight attendant Sandra Bradshaw called her husband at 09:50:04 and told him she was heating water to throw at the hijackers. Passenger Lauren Grandcolas called her husband twice, once before takeoff and once during the hijacking. He missed both her calls. Although it was thought that Grandcolas lent her phone to Honor Elizabeth Wainio, it was later determined to be Britton. Wainio called her stepmother at 09:53:43 and concluded, four and a half minutes later, by saying, "I have to go. They're breaking into the cockpit. I love you." Jarrah dialed in the VHF omnidirectional range (VOR) frequency for the VOR navigational aid at Reagan National Airport at 09:55:11 to direct the plane toward Washington, D.C.

Bradshaw, on the phone with her husband, said "Everyone is running up to first class. I've got to go. Bye." Beamer told GTE phone operator Lisa Jefferson that he and a few passengers were getting together and were planning to "jump" the hijacker with the bomb. Beamer recited the Lord's Prayer and the 23rd Psalm with Jefferson, prompting others to join in. Beamer requested of Jefferson, "If I don't make it, please call my family and let them know how much I love them." After this, Jefferson heard muffled voices and Beamer answering, "Are you ready? Okay. Let's roll." These were Beamer's last words to Jefferson.

During the hijacking, Flight 93 passed within  (instead of the normal ) of a NASA KC-135 returning from a microgravity flight over Lake Ontario. NASA pilot Dominic Del Rosso recalled how odd the silence on the radio was that morning.

Passenger revolt

The passenger revolt on Flight93 began at 09:57, after the passengers voted on whether to act. The plane left its Washington, D.C. course after the passengers revolted and the hijackers began maneuvering the plane violently in response.

The hijackers in the cockpit became aware of the revolt at 09:57:55, Jarrah exclaiming, "Is there something? A fight?"

Edward Felt dialed 9-1-1 from his cell phone from the rear lavatory of the aircraft seeking information at 09:58. His call was answered by dispatcher John Shaw, and Felt was able to tell him about the hijacking before the call was disconnected. Multiple news reports (originally based on a 9-1-1 supervisor's account after having overheard the call) asserted that Edward Felt reported hearing an explosion and seeing smoke from an undetermined location on the plane. These reports were not corroborated by Shaw or Felt's wife, Sandra, who listened to the recording afterwards.

CeeCee Lyles called her husband once more from a cell phone and told him the passengers were forcing their way into the cockpit. Jarrah began to roll the airplane left and right to knock the passengers off balance. He told another hijacker in the cockpit at 09:58:57, "They want to get in here. Hold, hold from the inside. Hold from the inside. Hold." Jarrah changed tactics at 09:59:52 and pitched the nose of the airplane up and down to disrupt the assault.

The cockpit voice recorder captured the sounds of crashing, screaming, and the shattering of glass and plates. Three times in a period of five seconds there were shouts of pain or distress from a hijacker outside the cockpit, suggesting a hijacker who was standing guard outside the cockpit was being attacked by the passengers. Jarrah stabilized the plane at 10:00:03. Five seconds later, he asked, "Is that it? Shall we finish it off?" Another hijacker responded, "No. Not yet. When they all come, we finish it off." Jarrah once again pitched the airplane up and down.

A passenger in the background cried, "In the cockpit! If we don't, we'll die!" at 10:00:25. Sixteen seconds later, another passenger yelled, "Roll it!", possibly referring to using the food cart. The voice recorder captured the sound of the passengers using the food cart as a battering ram against the cockpit door.

Jarrah ceased the violent maneuvers at 10:01:00 and recited the takbir twice. He then asked another hijacker, "Is that it? I mean, shall we put it down?" The other hijacker responded, "Yes, put it in it, and pull it down." The passengers continued their assault and at 10:02:17, a male passenger said, "Turn it up!" A second later, a hijacker said, "Pull it down! Pull it down!" At 10:02:33, Jarrah made a desperate plea in Arabic, repeatedly screaming "Give it to me!", possibly referring to the plane's yoke.

The hijackers inside the cockpit are heard yelling "No!" over the sound of breaking glass. The final spoken words on the recorder were a calm voice in English instructing, "Pull it up." The plane then crashed into an empty field in Stonycreek, Pennsylvania, about 20 minutes' flying time from Washington, D.C. The last entry on the voice recorder was made at 10:03:09. The last piece of flight data was recorded at 10:03:10.

There is disagreement among some family members of the passengers and the investigative officials as to whether the passengers managed to breach the cockpit or even break the cockpit door. The 9/11 Commission Report concluded that "the hijackers remained at the controls but must have judged that the passengers were only seconds from overcoming them". Many of the passengers' family members, having heard the audio recordings, believe the passengers breached the cockpit and killed at least one of the hijackers guarding the cockpit door; some interpreted the audio as suggesting that the passengers and hijackers struggled for control of the yoke.

Vice President Dick Cheney, in the Presidential Emergency Operations Center deep under the White House, authorized Flight 93 to be shot down, but upon learning of the crash, is reported to have said, "I think an act of heroism just took place on that plane."

Crash

At 10:03:11, near Indian Lake and Shanksville, Pennsylvania, the plane crashed into a field near a reclaimed coal strip mine known as the Diamond T. Mine owned by PBS Coals in Stonycreek Township in Somerset County. Far-flung debris that made up a third of the aircraft, including the cockpit, continued into the woods, demolishing trees on  owned by the Lambert family, and damaging the nearby residence of Barry Hoover. The rest of the aircraft buried itself in dirt that had been transported to the abandoned strip mine for reclamation efforts in the 1990s. The fuselage and wings shattered as they burrowed into the earth.

The coroner ruled that everyone on board who was still alive at the time of the crash died instantly of blunt-force trauma. Many media reports and eyewitness accounts said the time of the crash was 10:06 or 10:10; an initial analysis of seismographic data in the area concluded that the crash occurred at 10:06, but the 9/11 Commission report states that this analysis was not definitive and was retracted. Other media outlets and the 9/11 Commission reported the time of impact as 10:03, based on when the flight recorders stopped, analysis of radar data, infrared satellite data, and air traffic control transmissions.

The only known witness to the actual crash, and the last one to see United 93 airborne, was Stoney Creek resident Nevin Lambert, who reported that he saw the plane upside down as it crashed to the ground in a 45 degree-angled nosedive. Kelly Leverknight, a local resident, was watching news of the attacks when she heard the plane. "I heard the plane going over and I went out the front door and I saw the plane going down. It was headed toward the school, which panicked me, because all three of my kids were there. Then you heard the explosion and felt the blast and saw the fire and smoke." Another witness, Eric Peterson, looked up when he heard the plane, "It was low enough, I thought you could probably count the rivets. You could see more of the roof of the plane than you could the belly. It was on its side. There was a great explosion and you could see the flames. It was a massive, massive explosion. Flames and then smoke and then a massive, massive mushroom cloud."

Val McClatchey had been watching footage of the attacks when she heard the plane. She saw it briefly, then heard the impact. The crash knocked out the electricity and phones. McClatchey grabbed her camera and took the only known picture of the smoke cloud from the explosion.

The first responders arrived at the crash site after 10:06. Cleveland Center controllers, unaware the flight had crashed, notified the Northeast Air Defense Sector (NEADS) at 10:07 that Flight93 had a bomb on board and passed the last known position. This call was the first time the military was notified about the flight. Ballinger sent one final ACARS message to Flight93 at 10:10, "Don't divert to DC. Not an option." He repeated the message one minute later. The Herndon Command Center alerted FAA headquarters that Flight93 had crashed at 10:13. NEADS called the Washington Air Route Traffic Control Center for an update on Flight93 and received notification that the flight had crashed.

At 10:37, CNN correspondent Aaron Brown, covering the collapse of the World Trade Center, announced, "We are getting reports and we are getting lots of reports and we want to be careful to tell you when we have confirmed them and not, but we have a report that a 747 is down in Pennsylvania, and that remains unconfirmed at this point." Don't know whose airline it was, whose airplane it was, and we don't have any details beyond that which I have just given you." In the confusion, he also erroneously reported a second hijacked plane heading for the Pentagon after the crash of the first.

Aftermath

Flight 93 fragmented violently upon impact. Most of the aircraft wreckage was found near the impact crater. Investigators found very light debris including paper and nylon scattered up to eight miles (13km) from the impact point in New Baltimore. All human remains were found within a 70-acre (28 ha) area surrounding the impact point.

Somerset County Coroner Wally Miller was involved in the investigation and identification of the remains. In examining the wreckage, the only human body part he could see was part of a backbone. The rest of the remains were consumed by the impact. Investigators identified four victims by September 22 and eleven by September 24. They identified another by September 29. 34 passengers were identified by October 27.

All the people on board the flight were identified by December 21. Human remains were so fragmented that investigators could not determine whether any victims were dead before the plane crashed. Death certificates for the 40 victims listed the cause of death as homicide and listed the cause of death for the four hijackers as suicide. The remains and personal effects of the victims were returned to the families. The remains of the hijackers, identified by the process of elimination, were turned over to the Federal Bureau of Investigation (FBI) as evidence.

Investigators also found a knife concealed in a cigarette lighter. They located the flight data recorder on September 13 and the cockpit voice recorder the following day. The FBI initially refused to release the voice recording, rejecting requests by Congresswoman Ellen Tauscher and family members of those on board. While access to voice recordings is usually restricted to government crash investigators and plane crash litigants, the FBI made an exception by allowing the relatives of Flight93 victims to listen to the recording in a closed session on April 18, 2002. Jurors for the Zacarias Moussaoui trial heard the tape as part of the proceedings and the transcript was publicly released on April 12, 2006. The audio recording has still not been released to the public, per the request of the victims' loved ones.

The passengers (other than the hijackers) and crew on board Flight93 were nominated for the Congressional Gold Medal on September 19, 2001. Congressman Bill Shuster introduced a bill to this effect in 2006, and they were granted on September 11, 2014. The obverse of the Medal is inscribed with "A common field one day, a field of honor forever" and "Act of Congress 2011". The reverse of the Medal features 40 stars (in honor of each of the passengers and crew), a sentinel eagle clasping laurel branches, the western front of the U.S. Capitol, and the inscription "We honor the passengers and crew of Flight 93 who perished in a Pennsylvania field on September 11, 2001. Their courageous action will be remembered forever."

Beamer's final words, "let's roll", became a national catchphrase. The Port Authority of New York and New Jersey changed the name of Newark's airport from Newark International Airport to Newark Liberty International Airport and a flag now flies over Terminal A's Gate A17. Flight93 has been the subject of various films and documentaries including The Flight That Fought Back, Flight 93, and the feature film United 93.

Flight number 93 was retired by United Airlines after the hijacking. It was reported in May 2011 that United was reactivating flight numbers 93 and 175 as a codeshare operated by Continental, sparking an outcry from some in the media and the labor union representing United pilots. United said the reactivation was a mistake and said the numbers were "inadvertently reinstated", and would not be reactivated.

Possible targets

The intended target of Flight93 has never been definitively confirmed.  However, investigators have said there is high probability that the most likely target was the United States Capitol.

Before the attacks, Khalid Sheikh Mohammed, Osama bin Laden, and Mohammed Atef developed a list of potential targets. Bin Laden wanted to destroy the White House and the Pentagon. Sheikh Mohammed wanted to strike the World Trade Center and all three wanted to hit the Capitol. No one else was involved in the initial selection of targets. Bin Laden told 9/11 planner Ramzi bin al-Shibh to advise Mohamed Atta that he preferred the White House over the Capitol as a target. Atta cautioned bin al-Shibh that this would be difficult, but agreed to include the White House as a possible target and suggested they keep the Capitol as an alternative in case the White House proved too difficult. Eventually, Atta told bin al-Shibh that Jarrah planned to hit the Capitol. Atta briefly mentioned the possibility of striking a nuclear facility, but relented after the other attack pilots voiced their opposition. Based on an exchange between Atta and bin al-Shibh two days before the attacks, the White House would be the primary target for the fourth plane and the Capitol the secondary target. If any pilot could not reach his intended target, he was to crash the plane.

Immediately after the attacks, there was speculation that Camp David was the intended target. According to testimony by captured al-Qaeda member Abu Zubaydah, U.S. officials believed the White House was the intended target. A post-9/11 interview with Khalid Sheikh Mohammed and bin al-Shibh by Al Jazeera reporter Yosri Fouda said Flight93 was heading for the Capitol. The 9/11 Commission Report cited the actions of the crew and passengers in preventing the destruction of either the White House or the Capitol. According to further testimony by Sheikh Mohammed, bin Laden preferred the Capitol over the White House as a target. Salim Hamdan, bin Laden's driver, told interrogators that he knew that the flight was heading for the Capitol.

Fighter jet response

Two F-16 fighter pilots from the 121st Fighter Squadron of the D.C. Air National Guard, Marc Sasseville and Heather "Lucky" Penney, were scrambled and ordered to intercept Flight 93. The pilots intended to ram it since they did not have time to arm the jets; this was in the days before armed jets stood ready to take off at a moment's notice to protect the capital's airspace. They never reached Flight 93 and did not learn of its crash until hours afterwards.

A fighter pilot based at Andrews Air Force Base, Billy Hutchison, claimed that while in the air he spotted Flight 93 on his scope and planned to first fire his training rounds into the engine and cockpit, and then ram the airplane with his own jet. His account was published in Lynn Spencer's book Touching History. John Farmer, Senior Counsel to the 9/11 commission, pointed out that this would have been impossible, as Hutchison's squadron was not in the air until 10:38, thirty-five minutes after Flight 93 had crashed. When the 9/11 Commission asked Hutchison why he gave this false claim he refused to give an answer and stormed out of the room.

The North American Aerospace Defense Command (NORAD) stated to the 9/11 Commission that fighters would have intercepted Flight93 before it reached its target in Washington, D.C., but the commission disagreed, saying that "NORAD did not even know the plane was hijacked until after it had crashed" and concluding that had it not crashed it probably would have arrived in Washington by 10:23. The 9/11 Commission Report stated that NEADS fighters pursued Delta Air Lines Flight 1989, a flight thought to be hijacked. The commission found that NORAD and the FAA gave inaccurate testimony.

Memorials

A temporary memorial formed from spontaneous tributes left by visitors in the days after the attacks at the crash site. Foundations across the country began to raise money to fund a memorial to the victims within a month of the crash.

Two years after the attacks, federal officials formed the Flight93 National Memorial Advisory Commission responsible for making design recommendations for a permanent memorial. A national design competition was held to create a public memorial in the Pennsylvania field where Flight93 crashed. The winning design, "Crescent of Embrace", was selected out of a pool of 1,011 submissions on September 7, 2005. The site plan features a large crescent pathway with red maples and sugar maples planted along the outer arc.

This design ran into opposition over funding, size, and appearance. Republican Congressman Charles H. Taylor blocked $10million in federal funds toward the project as he saw it as "unrealistic". Republican Congressional leaders later persuaded him to acquiesce to political pressure and began approving federal funds. The proposed design has also attracted critics who see Islamic symbolism in the crescent design.

On August 31, 2009, an agreement was announced between the landowners and the National Park Service to allow the purchase of land for $9.5million. The memorial area with a white marble Wall of Names was dedicated on September 10, 2011, the day before the 10th anniversary of the crash. A concrete and glass visitor center was opened on September 10, 2015 on a hill overlooking the memorial, with both the visitor center and the Wall of Names being aligned with the flight path and the final piece, the "Tower of Voices", was dedicated during a ceremony on September 9, 2018.

CeeCee Lyles was one of the flight attendants on board. In 2003, a statue of Lyles was unveiled in her hometown of Fort Pierce, Florida, which has since gained national recognition as one of the many monuments to the attacks. On August 9, 2007, a portion of U.S.219 in Somerset County, near the Flight 93 National Memorial, was co-signed as the Flight 93 Memorial Highway. At the National September 11 Memorial, the names of the victims of Flight93 are inscribed on Panels S-67 and S-68 at the South Pool.

On the sixteenth anniversary of the crash, Vice President Mike Pence spoke at the memorial: "Without regard to personal safety, they [the victims] rushed forward to save [our] lives... I will always believe that I and many others in our nation's capital were able to go home that day and hug our families because of the courage and sacrifice of the heroes of Flight93."

On 21 June 2018, the remaining wreckage of Flight 93, which had been stored in shipping containers in a warehouse since the crash, was buried at the crash site in a private ceremony. Prior to the ceremony, the wreckage was hand-searched for personal effects and human remains that might have been missed in years prior.

Victims
The passengers (excluding the hijackers) and crew were from:

See also
 List of thwarted Islamist terrorist attacks
 I Missed Flight 93

References

Further reading
  [for children]

External links

 United Airlines Flight #93 Cockpit Voice Recorder Transcript from CNN. (Archive from CNN; Archive at webcitation.org)
 Flight 93 National Memorial Campaign (official website)
 
 

 
2001 in Pennsylvania
Accidents and incidents involving the Boeing 757
Aircraft hijackings in the United States
Airliner accidents and incidents caused by hijacking
Airliner accidents and incidents in Pennsylvania
Airliner accidents and incidents involving deliberate crashes
Airliners involved in the September 11 attacks
Articles containing video clips
Attacks in the United States in 2001
Attacks on the United States Congress
Aviation accidents and incidents in the United States in 2001
Attempted crimes
Failed terrorist attempts in North America
Failed terrorist attempts in the United States
Mass murder in Pennsylvania
Mass murder in the United States
Murder–suicides in Pennsylvania
Murder–suicides in the United States
Mass murder in 2001
2001 murders in the United States
Suicides in Pennsylvania
Newark Liberty International Airport
Islamic terrorism in the United States
Somerset County, Pennsylvania
Terrorist incidents in the United States in 2001
93
Terrorist incidents in Pennsylvania